Corinth Baptist Church is a historic African-American Baptist church located on N. Herndon Street in Union, Union County, South Carolina.  It was built in 1893–1894, and is a brick Late Gothic Revival-style church.

It was added to the National Register of Historic Places in 1989.

References

Baptist churches in South Carolina
Churches on the National Register of Historic Places in South Carolina
Gothic Revival church buildings in South Carolina
Churches in Union County, South Carolina
African-American history of South Carolina
National Register of Historic Places in Union County, South Carolina